Xishan District is one of five urban districts of Wuxi, Jiangsu Province, People's Republic of China.

Administrative divisions
In the present, Xishan District has 4 subdistricts and 4 towns.
4 subdistricts

4 towns

References

External links
Wuxi Xishan District site

County-level divisions of Jiangsu
Wuxi